The 1998 Finnish Cup was the 44th season of the main annual association football cup competition in Finland. It was organised as a single-elimination knock–out tournament and participation in the competition was voluntary.  The final was held at the Olympic Stadium, Helsinki on 31 October 1998 with HJK defeating PK-35 by 3-2 before an attendance of 5,023 spectators.

Early rounds 
Not currently available.

Round 7

Quarter-finals

Semi-finals

Final

References

External links
 Suomen Cup Official site 

Finnish Cup seasons
Finnish Cup, 1998
Finnish Cup, 1998